Pedro Antonio de Alarcón y Ariza (10 March 183319 July 1891) was a nineteenth-century Spanish novelist, known best for his novel El sombrero de tres picos (1874), an adaptation of popular traditions which provides a description of village life in Alarcón's native region of Andalusia. It was the basis for Hugo Wolf's opera Der Corregidor (1897); for Riccardo Zandonai's opera La farsa amorosa (1933); and Manuel de Falla's ballet The Three-Cornered Hat (1919).

Alarcón wrote another popular short novel,  ('Captain Poison', 1881). He produced four other full-length novels. One of these novels, El escándalo ('The Scandal', 1875), became noted for its keen psychological insights.  Alarcón also wrote three travel books and many short stories and essays.

Alarcón was born in Guadix, near Granada. In 1859, he served in a Spanish military operation in Morocco.

Works

 Cuentos amatorios.
 El final de Norma: novela (1855).
 Descubrimiento y paso del cabo de Buena Esperanza (1857).
 Diario de un testigo de la Guerra de África (1859).
 De Madrid a Nápoles (1860).
 Dos ángeles caídos y otros escritos olvidados.
 El amigo de la muerte: cuento fantástico (1852).
 El año en Spitzberg.
 El capitán Veneno: novela.
 El clavo.
 El coro de Angeles (1858).
 La Alpujarra (1873).
 El sombrero de tres picos: novela corta (1874).
 El escándalo (1875)
 El extranjero.
 El niño de la Bola (1880).
 Historietas nacionales.
 Juicios literarios y artísticos.
 La Alpujarra: sesenta leguas a caballo precedidas de seis en diligencia.
 La Comendadora.
 La mujer alta: cuento de miedo.
 La pródiga.
 Lo que se oye desde una silla del Prado.
 Los ojos negros.
 Los seis velos.
 Moros y cristianos.
 Narraciones inverosímiles.
 Obras literarias de Pedro Antonio de Alarcón. Volumen 2
 Obras literarias de Pedro Antonio de Alarcón. Volumen 1
 Obras literarias de Pedro Antonio de Alarcón. Volumen 3
 Poesías serias y humorísticas
 Soy, tengo y quiero.
 Viajes por España. 
 Últimos escritos.

References
World Book encyclopedia 1988

External links

 
  
 
 Las Dos Glorias in Spanish with English translation
 

1833 births
1891 deaths
People from Guadix
19th-century Spanish novelists
Spanish male novelists
Spanish humorists
Members of the Royal Spanish Academy
19th-century male writers
19th-century travel writers
Spanish travel writers